A parallel universe, also known as a parallel dimension, alternate universe, or alternate reality, is a hypothetical self-contained plane of existence, co-existing with one's own. The sum of all potential parallel universes that constitute reality is often called a "multiverse".

While the four terms are generally synonymous and can be used interchangeably in most cases, there is sometimes an additional connotation implied with the term "alternate universe/reality" that implies that the reality is a variant of our own, with some overlap with the similarly named alternate history.
Fiction has long borrowed an idea of "another world" from myth, legend and religion. Heaven, Hell, Olympus, and Valhalla are all "alternative universes" different from the familiar material realm. Plato reflected deeply on the parallel realities, resulting in Platonism, in which the upper reality is perfect while the lower earthly reality is an imperfect shadow of the heavenly.

The concept is also found in ancient Hindu mythology, in texts such as the Puranas, which expressed an infinite number of universes, each with its own gods. Similarly in Persian literature, "The Adventures of Bulukiya," a tale in the One Thousand and One Nights, describes the protagonist Bulukiya learning of alternative worlds/universes that are similar to but still distinct from his own.

One of the first science fiction examples is Murray Leinster's short story, Sidewise in Time published in 1934, in which portions of alternative universes replace corresponding geographical regions in this universe.  Sidewise in Time analogizes time to the geographic coordinate system, with travel along latitude corresponding to time travel moving through past, present and future, and travel along longitude corresponding to travel perpendicular to time and to other realities, hence the name of the story.  Thus, another common term for a parallel universe is "another dimension," stemming from the idea that if the 4th dimension is time, the 5th dimension—a direction at a right angle to the fourth—is an alternate reality.

In modern literature, parallel universes can serve two main purposes: to allow stories with elements that would ordinarily violate the laws of nature; and to serve as a starting point for speculative fiction, asking oneself "What if [event] turned out differently?". Examples of the former include Terry Pratchett's Discworld and C. S. Lewis's The Chronicles of Narnia, while examples of the latter include Harry Turtledove's Worldwar series.

A parallel universe—or more specifically, continued interaction between the parallel universe and our own—may serve as a central plot point, or it may simply be mentioned and quickly dismissed, having served its purpose of establishing a realm unconstrained by realism. The aforementioned Discworld, for example, only very rarely mentions our world or any other worlds, as Pratchett set the books in a parallel universe instead of "our" reality to allow for magic on the Disc. The Chronicles of Narnia also utilizes to a lesser extent the idea of parallel universes; this is brought up but only briefly mentioned in the introduction and ending, its main purpose to bring the protagonist from "our" reality to the setting of the books.

Science fiction
While technically incorrect, and looked down upon by hard science-fiction fans and authors, the idea of another "dimension" has become synonymous with the term "parallel universe". The usage is particularly common in movies, television and comic books and much less so in modern prose science fiction. The idea of a parallel world was popularized in comic books with the publication of The Flash #123, Flash of Two Worlds in 1961.

In written science fiction, "new dimension" more commonly—and more accurately—refer to additional coordinate axes, beyond the three spatial axes with which we are familiar. By proposing travel along these extra axes, which are not normally perceptible, the traveller can reach worlds that are otherwise unreachable and invisible.

In 1884, Edwin A. Abbott wrote the seminal novel exploring this concept called Flatland: A Romance of Many Dimensions. It describes a world of two dimensions inhabited by living squares, triangles, and circles, called Flatland, as well as Pointland (0 dimensions), Lineland (1 dimension), and Spaceland (three dimensions) and finally posits the possibilities of even greater dimensions. Isaac Asimov, in his foreword to the Signet Classics 1984 edition, described Flatland as "The best introduction one can find into the manner of perceiving dimensions".

In 1895, The Time Machine by H. G. Wells used time as an additional "dimension" in this sense, taking the four-dimensional model of classical physics and interpreting time as a space-like dimension in which humans could travel with the right equipment. Wells also used the concept of parallel universes as a consequence of time as the fourth dimension in stories like The Wonderful Visit and Men Like Gods, an idea proposed by the astronomer Simon Newcomb, who talked about both time and parallel universes; "Add a fourth dimension to space, and there is room for an indefinite number of universes, all alongside of each other, as there is for an indefinite number of sheets of paper when we pile them upon each other."

There are many examples where authors have explicitly created additional spatial dimensions for their characters to travel in, to reach parallel universes. In Doctor Who, the Doctor accidentally enters a parallel universe while attempting to repair the TARDIS console in "Inferno". Douglas Adams, in the last book of the Hitchhiker's Guide to the Galaxy series, Mostly Harmless, uses the idea of probability as an extra axis in addition to the classical four dimensions of space and time similar to the many-worlds interpretation of quantum physics, although according to the novel they were more a model to capture the continuity of space, time and probability. Robert A. Heinlein, in The Number of the Beast, postulated a six-dimensional universe. In addition to the three spatial dimensions, he invoked symmetry to add two new temporal dimensions, so there would be two sets of three. Like the fourth dimension of H. G. Wells' "Time Traveller," these extra dimensions can be traveled by persons using the right equipment.

Hyperspace

Perhaps the most common use of the concept of a parallel universe in science fiction is the concept of hyperspace. Used in science fiction, the concept of "hyperspace" often refers to a parallel universe that can be used as a faster-than-light shortcut for interstellar travel. Rationales for this form of hyperspace vary from work to work, but the two common elements are:
It is possible to enter and exit from this hyperspace with reasonable ease.
There is reason to enter and exit hyperspace rather than travel conventionally (in most settings, 'hyperspace' is considered a faster form of travel).

Sometimes "hyperspace" is used to refer to the concept of additional coordinate axes. In this model, the universe is thought to be "crumpled" in some higher spatial dimension, and that traveling in this higher spatial dimension, a ship can move vast distances in the common spatial dimensions. An analogy is to crumple a newspaper into a ball and stick a needle straight through: the needle will make widely spaced holes in the two-dimensional surface of the paper. While this idea invokes a "new dimension", it is not an example of a parallel universe. It is a more scientifically plausible use of hyperspace. (See wormhole.)

While the use of hyperspace is common, it is mostly used as a plot device and thus of secondary importance. While a parallel universe may be invoked by the concept, the nature of the universe is not often explored. So, while stories involving hyperspace might be the most common use of the parallel universe concept in fiction, it is not the most common source of fiction about parallel universes.

Time travel

Time travel can result in multiple universes if a time traveller can change the past. In one interpretation, alternative histories as a result of time travel are not parallel universes: while multiple parallel universes can co-exist simultaneously, only one history or alternative history can exist at any one moment, as alternative history usually involves, in essence, overriding the original timeline with a new one.  As a result, travel between alternative histories is not possible without reverting the timeline back to the original.

There are exceptions to the above, and an alternate history doesn't necessarily overwrite the old one. There are no rules written in stone regarding this. Modern ideas of time travel pose the idea of branching timelines, such as the 2009 Star Trek reboot and Avengers: Endgame. Technically, if a timeline is not explicitly stated to have been erased, it is still there.

Parallel universes as a result of time travel can serve simply as the backdrop, or it may be a central plot point. The Guns of the South by Harry Turtledove, where the Confederate Army is given thousands of AK-47 rifles and ends up winning the American Civil War, is a good example of the former, while Fritz Leiber's novel The Big Time where a war between two alternative futures manipulating history to create a timeline that results in or realizes their own world is a good example of the latter.

Multiple worlds and time travel
Subscribing to the many-worlds interpretation of quantum physics, alternative histories in fiction can arise as a natural phenomenon of the universe. In these works, the idea is that each choice every person makes, each leading to a different result, both occur, so when a person decides between jam or butter on his toast, two universes are created: one where that person chose jam, and another where that person chose butter. The concept of "sidewise" time travel, a term taken from Murray Leinster's "Sidewise in Time", is used to allow characters to pass through many different alternative histories, all descendant from some common branch point.

Often, worlds that are more similar to each other are considered closer to each other in terms of this sidewise travel. For example, a universe where World War II ended differently would be "closer" to us than one where Imperial China colonized the New World in the 15th century. H. Beam Piper used this concept, naming it "paratime" and writing a series of stories involving the Paratime Police who regulated travel between these alternative realities as well as the technology to do so. Keith Laumer used the same concept of "sideways" time travel in his 1962 novel Worlds of the Imperium. More recently, novels such as Frederik Pohl's The Coming of the Quantum Cats and Neal Stephenson's Anathem explore human-scale readings of the "many worlds" interpretation, postulating that historical events or human consciousness spawns or allows "travel" among alternative universes.

Universe 'types' frequently explored in sidewise and alternative history works include worlds whose Nazis won the Second World War, as in The Man in the High Castle by Philip K. Dick, SS-GB by Len Deighton, and Fatherland by Robert Harris, and worlds whose Roman Empire never fell, as in Roma Eterna by Robert Silverberg, Romanitas by Sophia McDougall, and Warlords of Utopia by Lance Parkin.

Similar concepts

Counter-Earth

The concept of counter-Earth might seem similar to a parallel universe but is actually a distinct idea. A counter-earth is a planet that shares Earth's orbit but is on the opposition side of the sun, therefore, cannot be seen from Earth. There would be no necessity that such a planet would be like Earth in any way, although typically in fiction it is practically identical to Earth. Since Counter-Earth is not only within our universe but within our own Solar System, reaching it can be accomplished with ordinary space travel.

Convergent evolution and parallel evolution
Convergent evolution is a biological concept whereby unrelated species acquire similar traits because they adapted to a similar environment and/or played similar roles in their ecosystems. In fiction, the concept is extended whereby similar planets will result in races with similar cultures and/or histories. Again, this is not a true parallel universe since such planets exist within the same universe as our own, but the stories are similar in some respects. Star Trek frequently explored such worlds, in episodes including "Bread and Circuses",  "The Omega Glory", and "Miri".

The 2017 episode of British science fiction television programme Doctor Who, "The Doctor Falls", explains the different origins of the Cybermen as parallel evolution, due to the inevitability of humans and human-like species attempting to upgrade themselves through technology; this perspective resolves continuity differences in the Cybermen's history.

Convergent evolution may also be due to contamination. In this case, a planet may start out differently from Earth, but due to the influence of Earth's culture, the planet comes to resemble Earth in some way. Star Trek also frequently used this theory as well, for example, in "Patterns of Force" and "A Piece of the Action".

Simulated reality

Simulated realities are digital constructs featured in science fiction such as The Matrix which can parallel ours very closely.

Parallel Universe Theory

In 1954, Princeton University doctoral applicant Hugh Everett III proposed that parallel universes co-exist with and diverge from our own universe. Everett's Many-Worlds Theory, as it came to be known, wanted to respond to some unanswered inquiries raised in the developing field of quantum material science.
In 2012 two quantum physicists, Dr S.Haroche and Dr D. Worland, received a Nobel Prize for their experiments which showed that "a particle can be at two locations at the same time."

Fantasy

Transportation of modern characters to fantasy universe

It is common in fantasy for authors to find ways to bring a protagonist from "our" world to the fantasy world. Before the mid-20th century, this was most often done by hiding fantastic worlds within unknown, distant locations on Earth; peasants who seldom, if ever, traveled far from their villages could not conclusively say that it was impossible that an ogre or other fantastical beings could live an hour away. Characters in the author's world could board a ship and find themselves on a fantastic island, as Jonathan Swift does in Gulliver's Travels or in the 1949 novel Silverlock by John Myers Myers, or be sucked up into a tornado and land in Oz. These "lost world" stories can be seen as geographic equivalents of a "parallel universe," as the worlds portrayed are separate from our own, and hidden to everyone except those who take the difficult journey there. The geographic "lost world" can blur into a more explicit "parallel universe" when the fantasy realm overlaps a section of the "real" world, but is much larger inside than out, as in Robert Holdstock's novel Mythago Wood.

However, increasing geographical knowledge meant that such locations had to be farther and farther off. Perhaps influenced by ideas from science fiction, many works chose a setting that takes place in another, separate reality. As it is now not possible to reach these worlds via conventional travel, a common trope is a portal or artifact that connects our world and the fantasy world together, examples being the wardrobe in C. S. Lewis' The Lion, the Witch and the Wardrobe or the sigil in James Branch Cabell's The Cream of the Jest.

In some cases, physical travel is not even possible, and the character in our reality travels in a dream or some other altered state of consciousness. Examples include the Dream Cycle stories by H. P. Lovecraft or the Thomas Covenant stories of Stephen R. Donaldson. Often, stories of this type have as a major theme the nature of reality itself, questioning whether the dream-world is as real as the waking world. Science fiction often employs this theme in the ideas of cyberspace and virtual reality.

Between the worlds

In a few cases, the interaction between the worlds is an important element, so that the focus is not on simply the fantasy world, but on ours as well. Sometimes the intent is to let them mingle and see what would happen, such as introducing a computer programmer into a high fantasy world as seen in Rick Cook's Wizardry series, while other times an attempt to keep them from mingling becomes a major plot point, such as in Aaron Allston's Doc Sidhe. In that story, our "grim world" is paralleled by a "fair world" where the elves live and history echoes ours, where a major portion of the plot deals with preventing a change in interactions between the worlds.

Fantasy multiverses
The idea of a multiverse is as fertile a subject for fantasy as it is for science fiction, allowing for epic settings and superhuman protagonists. One example of an epic and far-ranging fantasy "multiverse" is that of Michael Moorcock, who actually named the concept in a 1963 science fiction novel The Sundered Worlds. Like many authors after him, Moorcock was inspired by the many worlds interpretation of quantum mechanics, saying, "It was an idea in the air, as most of these are, and I would have come across a reference to it in New Scientist (one of my best friends was then editor) ... [or] physicist friends would have been talking about it. ... Sometimes what happens is that you are imagining these things in the context of fiction while the physicists and mathematicians are imagining them in terms of science. I suspect it is the romantic imagination working, as it often does, perfectly efficiently in both the arts and the sciences."

Unlike many science-fiction interpretations, Moorcock's Eternal Champion stories go far beyond alternative history to include mythic and sword and sorcery settings as well as worlds more similar to, or the same as, our own.

The term 'polycosmos' was coined as an alternative to 'multiverse' by the author and editor Paul le Page Barnett (also known by the pseudonym John Grant), and is built from Greek rather than Latin morphemes. It is used by Barnett to describe a concept binding together a number of his works, its nature meaning that "all characters, real or fictional [...] have to co-exist in all possible real, created or dreamt worlds; [...] they're playing hugely different roles in their various manifestations, and the relationships between them can vary quite dramatically, but the essence of them remains the same."

Fictional universe as alternative universe

There are many examples of the meta-fictional idea of having the author's created universe (or any author's universe) rise to the same level of "reality" as the universe we're familiar with. The theme is present in works as diverse as H.G. Wells' Men Like Gods, Myers' Silverlock, and Heinlein's Number of the Beast. Fletcher Pratt and L. Sprague de Camp took the protagonist of the Harold Shea series through the worlds of Norse myth, Edmund Spenser's The Faerie Queene, Ludovico Ariosto's Orlando Furioso, and the Kalevala – without ever quite settling whether writers created these parallel worlds by writing these works, or received impressions from the worlds and wrote them down. In an interlude set in "Xanadu", a character claims that the universe is dangerous because the poem went unfinished, but whether this was his misapprehension or not is not established.

Some fictional approaches definitively establish the independence of the parallel world, sometimes by having the world differ from the book's account; other approaches have works of fiction create and affect the parallel world: L. Sprague de Camp's Solomon's Stone, taking place on an astral plane, is populated by the daydreams of mundane people, and in Rebecca Lickiss's Eccentric Circles, an elf is grateful to Tolkien for transforming elves from dainty little creatures. These stories often place the author, or authors in general, in the same position as Zelazny's characters in Amber. Questioning, in a literal fashion, if writing is an act of creating a new world, or an act of discovery of a pre-existing world.

Occasionally, this approach becomes self-referential, treating the literary universe of the work itself as explicitly parallel to the universe where the work was created. Stephen King's seven-volume Dark Tower series hinges upon the existence of multiple parallel worlds, many of which are King's own literary creations. Ultimately the characters become aware that they are only "real" in King's literary universe (this can be debated as an example of breaking the fourth wall), and even travel to a world – twice – in which (again, within the novel) they meet Stephen King and alter events in the real Stephen King's world outside of the books. An early instance of this was in works by Gardner Fox for DC Comics in the 1960s, in which characters from the Golden Age (which was supposed to be a series of comic books within the DC Comics universe) would cross over into the main DC Comics universe. One comic book did provide an explanation for a fictional universe existing as a parallel universe. The parallel world does "exist" and it resonates into the "real world". Some people in the "real world" pick up on this resonance, gaining information about the parallel world which they then use  to write stories.

Robert Heinlein, in The Number of the Beast, quantizes the many parallel fictional universes - in terms of fictions. A number of fictional universes are accessible along one of the three axes of time which Dr. Jacob Burroughs' "time twister" can access. Each quantum level change - a fiction - along this time axis corresponds to a different universe from one of several bodies of fiction known to all four travellers in the inter-universal, time traveling vehicle Gay Deceiver. Heinlein also "breaks the fourth wall" by having "both Heinleins" (Robert and his wife Virginia) visit an inter-universal science-fiction and fantasy convention in the book's last chapter. The convention was convened on Heinlein character Lazarus Long's estate on the planet "Tertius" to attract the evil "Black Hats" who pursued the main characters of The Number of the Beast through space and time in order to destroy Dr. Burroughs and his invention. Heinlein continues this literary conceit in The Cat Who Walks Through Walls and To Sail Beyond the Sunset, using characters from throughout his science-fictional career, hauled forth from their own "fictions" to unite in the war against the "Black Hats".

Heinlein also wrote a stand-alone novel, Job: A Comedy of Justice, whose two protagonists fall from alternative universe into alternative universe (often naked), and after a number of such adventures die and enter a stereotypically Fundamentalist Christian Heaven (with many of its internal contradictions explored in the novel). Their harrowing adventures through the universes are then revealed to have been "destruction testing" of their souls by Loki, sanctioned by the Creator person of the Christian God (Yahweh). The Devil appears as the most sympathetic of the gods in the story, who expresses contempt for the other gods' cavalier treatment of the story's main characters.
 
Thus, Job: A Comedy of Justice rings in the theological dimension (if only for the purpose of satirizing evangelical Christianity) of parallel universes, that their existence can be used by God (or a number of gods, Loki seems to have made himself available to do Yahweh's dirty work in this novel). It manages also to have a fictional multiverse angle in that references are made to Heinlein's early SF/fantasy short story "They", a solipsistic tale in which reality is constantly being transmogrified behind the scenes to throw the central character off his guard and keep him from seeing reality as it is, which was set in the same Heinlein fictional universe as The Moon is a Harsh Mistress.

Elfland

Elfland, or Faerie, the otherworldly home not only of elves and fairies but goblins, trolls, and other folkloric creatures, has an ambiguous appearance in folklore.

On one hand, the land often appears to be contiguous with 'ordinary' land. Thomas the Rhymer might, on being taken by the Queen of Faerie, be taken on a road like one leading to Heaven or Hell.

This is not exclusive to English or French folklore. In Norse mythology, Elfland (Alfheim) was also the name of what today is the Swedish province of Bohuslän. In the sagas, it said that the people of this petty kingdom were more beautiful than other people, as they were related to the elves, showing that not only the territory was associated with elves, but also the race of its people.

While sometimes folklore seems to show fairy intrusion into human lands – "Tam Lin" does not show any otherworldly aspects about the land in which the confrontation takes place – at other times the otherworldly aspects are clear. Most frequently, time can flow differently for those trapped by the fairy dance than in the lands they come from; although, in an additional complication, it may only be an appearance, as many returning from Faerie, such as Oisín, have found that time "catches up" with them as soon as they have contact with ordinary lands.

Fantasy writers have taken up the ambiguity. Some writers depict the land of the elves as a full-blown parallel universe, with portals the only entry – as in Josepha Sherman's Prince of the Sidhe series or Esther Friesner's Elf Defense – and others have depicted it as the next land over, possibly difficult to reach for magical reasons – Hope Mirrlees's Lud-in-the-Mist, or Lord Dunsany's The King of Elfland's Daughter. In some cases, the boundary between Elfland and more ordinary lands is not fixed. Not only the inhabitants but Faerie itself can pour into more mundane regions. Terry Pratchett's Discworld series proposes that the world of the Elves is a "parasite" universe, that drifts between and latches onto others such as Discworld and our own world (referred to as "Roundworld" in the novels). In the young teenage book Mist by Kathryn James, the Elven world lies through a patch of mist in the woods. It was constructed when the Elven were thrown out of our world. Travel to and fro is possible by those in the know, but can have lethal consequences.

Isekai

Isekai, is a subgenre of Japanese fantasy light novels, manga, anime, and video games revolving around a normal person being transported to or trapped in a parallel universe. Often, this universe already exists in the protagonist's world as a fictional universe, but it may also be unbeknownst to them.

Films

The most famous treatment of the alternative universe concept in film could be considered The Wizard of Oz, which portrays a parallel world, famously separating the magical realm of the Land of Oz from the mundane world by filming it in Technicolor while filming the scenes set in Kansas in sepia. At times, alternative universes have been featured in small scale independent productions such as Kevin Brownlow and Andrew Mollo's It Happened Here (1964), featuring an alternative United Kingdom which had undergone Operation Sea Lion in 1940 and had been defeated and occupied by Nazi Germany. It focused on moral questions related to the professional ethics of Pauline, a nurse forced into Nazi collaboration.

Another common use of the theme is as a prison for villains or demons. The idea is used in the first two Superman movies starring Christopher Reeve where Kryptonian villains were sentenced to the Phantom Zone from where they eventually escaped. An almost exactly parallel use of the idea is presented in the film The Adventures of Buckaroo Banzai Across the 8th Dimension, where the "8th dimension" is essentially a "phantom zone" used to imprison the villainous Red Lectroids. Uses in horror films include the 1986 film From Beyond (based on the H. P. Lovecraft story of the same name) where a scientific experiment induces the experimenters to perceive aliens from a parallel universe, with bad results. The 1987 John Carpenter film Prince of Darkness is based on the premise that the essence of a being described as Satan, trapped in a glass canister and found in an abandoned church in Los Angeles, is actually an alien being that is the 'son' of something even more evil and powerful, trapped in another universe. The protagonists accidentally free the creature, who then attempts to release his "father" by reaching in through a mirror. 1997 film Event Horizon (film) directed by Paul W. S. Anderson tells about a crew of eponymous space ship who are accidentally travelled to another dimension (implied to be hell), turning them insane and ended up killing each other.

Some films present parallel realities that are actually different contrasting versions of the narrative itself. Commonly this motif is presented as different points of view revolving around a central (but sometimes unknowable) "truth", the seminal example being Akira Kurosawa's Rashomon. Conversely, often in film noir and crime dramas, the alternative narrative is a fiction created by a central character, intentionally – as in The Usual Suspects – or unintentionally – as in Angel Heart. Less often, the alternative narratives are given equal weight in the story, making them truly alternative universes, such as in the German film Run Lola Run, the short-lived British West End musical Our House and the British film Sliding Doors.

More recent films that have explicitly explored parallel universes are: the 2000 film The Family Man, the 2001 cult film Donnie Darko, which deals with what it terms a "tangent universe" that erupts from our own universe; Super Mario Bros. (1993) has the eponymous heroes cross over into a parallel universe ruled by humanoids who evolved from dinosaurs; The One (2001) starring Jet Li, in which there is a complex system of realities in which Jet Li's character is a police officer in one universe and a serial killer in another, who travels to other universes to destroy versions of himself, so that he can take their energy; and FAQ: Frequently Asked Questions (2004), the main character runs away from a totalitarian nightmare, and he enters into a cyber-afterlife alternative reality. The current Star Trek films are set in an alternative universe created by the first film's villain traveling back in time, thus allowing the franchise to be rebooted without affecting the continuity of any other Star Trek film or show. The 2011 science-fiction thriller Source Code employs the concepts of quantum reality and parallel universes. The characters in The Cloverfield Paradox, the third installment of the franchise, accidentally create a ripple in the time-space continuum and travel into an alternative universe, where the monster and the events in the first film transpired. This concept has been also been passively depicted in the view of a romantic couple in the Indian Tamil Film Irandam Ulagam.
In the 2000 film The Beach, Leonardo DiCaprio's character Richard, while sitting on the beach with love interest Françoís (Virginie Ledoyen). describes the utopia they have found in Thailand as their own parallel universe.

The Marvel Cinematic Universe heavily features the multiverse. Doctor Strange features the Dark Dimension and the Masters of the Mystic Arts, who draw upon mystical energies from other realities. In Avengers: Endgame, the 2023 Avengers create alternate timelines during the Time Heist. The ramifications of these actions are explored in the television series Loki, which focuses on the 2012 variant of Loki and the Time Variance Authority. A female variant of Loki, Sylvie, kills the mastermind behind the TVA who kept the Sacred Timeline in order, which leads to the rebirth of the Multiverse. The animated series What If...? follows multiple variants of MCU characters and timelines guided by The Watcher. Shang-Chi and the Legend of the Ten Rings features Ta Lo, a mythical village also set in an alternate universe that houses many Chinese mythological creatures and where the climax of the film takes place. Spider-Man: No Way Home has Spider-Man encounter villains from the Spider-Man trilogy and The Amazing Spider-Man series and prevents their original deaths with help of other variants of himself. Doctor Strange in the Multiverse of Madness features Doctor Strange travelling throughout the multiverse trying to protect America Chavez from the Scarlet Witch, who seeks her power. Along the way, they encounter other variants of Strange, Christine Palmer, and the Illuminati.

The DC Extended Universe will also bring in the multiverse with its upcoming film The Flash (2023), when the title character, played by Ezra Miller, goes back in time to prevent his mother's murder, thus opening the multiverse. The film will feature both Michael Keaton and Ben Affleck both reprising their versions of Batman, with the film also introducing the DCEU version of Supergirl, portrayed by Sasha Calle, and Miller portraying an alternate version of the character from the Keaton Batman universe.

Television 

The idea of parallel universes has received treatment in a number of television series, usually as a single story or episode in a more general science fiction or fantasy storyline.

 The 1990s TV series Sliders depicts a group of adventurers visiting assorted parallel universes, as they attempt to find their "home" universe. Included in the 1st season is a universe where the world is stuck in the ice age, with no life anywhere. Another episode includes 'Honest Abe' never to be president, in which the United States loses World War I and World War II, and they are controlled by a senator, and technology is at an all-time low.
 One of the earliest television plots to feature parallel time (outside of the Twilight Zone) was a 1970 storyline on the soap opera Dark Shadows. Vampire Barnabas Collins found a room in Collinwood which served as a portal to parallel time, and he entered the room in an attempt to escape from his current problems. A year later, the show again traveled to parallel time, the setting this time being 1841.
 A well known and often imitated example is the 1967 original Star Trek episode entitled "Mirror, Mirror". The episode introduced an alternative version of the Star Trek universe where the main characters were barbaric and cruel to the point of being evil twins. When the parallel universe concept is parodied, the allusion is often to this episode. An earlier episode for the Trek series first hinted at the potential of differing reality planes (and their occupants), titled "The Alternative Factor". A mad scientist from "our" universe, named Lazarus B., hunts down the sane Lazarus A.; resident of an antimatter-comprised continuum. His counterpart, in a state of paranoia, claims the double threatens his and the very cosmos' existence. With help from Captain Kirk, A traps B along with him in a "anti"-universe, for eternity, thus bringing balance to both matter-oriented realms. A similar plot was used in the Codename: Kids Next Door episode Operation: P.O.O.L..
 The mirror universe of Star Trek was further developed by later series in the franchise. In several episodes of Star Trek: Deep Space Nine, the later evolution of the mirror universe is explored. A two-part episode of Star Trek: Enterprise, entitled "In a Mirror, Darkly", serves as a prequel, introducing the early developments of the Mirror Universe.
 In the 1970s young adult British SF series The Tomorrow People, its second-season episode, A Rift in Time (March–April 1974) pitted the three telepath core characters and allies against time travelling interlopers from an alternative history where the Roman Empire developed the steam engine in the first century CE, had a technological head start, did not fragment during the fifth century and underwent accelerated technological development. The Roman eagle standard was planted on the Moon in the fifth century and by its alternative twentieth century, it had mastered interstellar travel, had a galactic empire and time travel. Consequently, the Tomorrow People had to rectify this aberrant timeline by dismantling and disabling the anomalous steam engine.
 Multiple episodes of Red Dwarf use the concept. In "Parallel Universe" the crew meet alternative versions of themselves: the analogues of Lister, Rimmer and Holly are female, while the Cat's alternative is a dog. "Dimension Jump" introduces a heroic alternative Rimmer, a version of whom reappears in "Stoke Me a Clipper". The next episode, "Ouroboros", makes contact with a timeline in which Kochanski, rather than Lister, was the sole survivor of the original disaster; this alternative Kochanski then joins the crew for the remaining episodes.
 Buffy the Vampire Slayer experienced a Parallel universe where she was a mental patient in Normal Again and not really "The Slayer" at all. In the end, she has to choose between a universe where her mother and father are together and alive (mother) or one with her friends and sister in it where she has to fight for her life daily. In The Wish (Buffy the Vampire Slayer), Cordelia Chase inadvertently created a dystopian alternative reality in which Buffy had never moved from LA to Sunnydale. Her core-universe allies Xander Harris and Willow Rosenberg had become vampires in that timeline.
 The plot of the season four episode of Charmed, entitled "Brain Drain", features The Source of All Evil kidnapping Piper Halliwell and forcing her into a deep coma, where she experiences an alternative reality in which the Halliwell manor is actually a mental institution. She and her sisters serve as patients in this universe, their powers only a manifestation of their minds, a ruse put up to trick Piper into willingly relinquishing the sisters' magic.
 The Stargate franchise includes many stories in which alternate timelines, alternate dimensions and alternate realities are explored. These include the Stargate SG-1 episodes "There But For the Grace of God", "Point of View", "Crystal Skull", "2010", "Moebius" parts 1 and 2, "Babylon", "Ripple Effect", "Arthur's Mantle", "The Road Not Taken", "Unending" and the direct-to-DVD movie Stargate: Continuum, the Stargate Atlantis episodes "Before I Sleep", "McKay and Mrs. Miller", "The Last Man", "The Daedalus Variations", "Vegas" and "Enemy at the Gate", and the Stargate Universe episodes "Time", "Twin Destinies", "Common Descent" and "Epilogue".
 The animated series, Futurama, had an episode where the characters travel between "Universe 1" and "Universe A (also known as universe Γ)" via boxes containing each universe; and one of the major jokes is an extended argument between the two sets of characters over which set were the "evil" ones. They also had another episode where they travel to the edge of the universe and in the distance was the cowboy universe where everyone was dressed as cowboys. It was accidentally invented by Professor Farnsworth.
 The idea of a parallel universe and the concept of déjà vu was a major plot line of the first-season finale of Fringe, guest-starring Leonard Nimoy of Star Trek. The show has gone on to feature the parallel universe prominently.
 In the 2010 season of Lost, the result of characters traveling back in time to prevent the crash of Oceanic Flight 815 apparently creates a parallel reality in which the Flight never crashed, rather than resetting time itself in the characters' original timeline. The show continued to show two "sets" of the characters following different destinies, until it was revealed in the series finale that there was really only one reality created by the characters themselves to assist themselves in leaving behind the physical world and passing on to an afterlife after their respective deaths.
 In the anime and manga series of Dragon Ball Z, in the Androids Saga, Future Trunks returns to the past to give Goku medicine to prevent him from dying of a heart disease and warns him of the Androids, in the process creating a timeline split of parallel realities. This event leads to the appearance of Cell, who kills the same Future Trunks after he originally returns from the past of and kills the Androids via a remote control in his own timeline. Cell does this in order to go to the main timeline of the series when the Androids are still alive for him to absorb. Back in the same past the series follows, Future Trunks discovers the existence of the time machine Cell stole in the original future reality, leading him to make the decision to stay in past instead. This creates a parallel reality for his own future timeline where he is physically capable of killing both the Androids and Cell once he returns after the events of the Cell Saga.
 Its sequel, Dragon Ball Super, later features separate universes that are in pairs whose numbers add up to the total number of the universe: 12 in this case. Previously there were 18 universes, but Zeno (the supreme ruler of the Dragon Ball Multiverse) destroyed 6 of them in a fit of rage. Previously, Daizenshuu 7 stated that the typical Dragon Ball Universe had only 4 galaxies, but Dragon Ball Super effectively retcons this, where Whis says that the universe contains endless galaxies.
The spin-off series Super Dragon Ball Heroes features alternate versions of the main characters who protect the flow of time as part of the "Time Patrol". They usually have the "Xeno" moniker in addition to their names (e.g. Goku Xeno, Vegeta Xeno, Trunks Xeno, etc.).
 The anime Turn A Gundam attempted to combine all the parallel Gundam universes (other incarnations of the series, with similar themes but differing stories and characters, that had played out at different times since the debut of the concept in the 1970s) of the metaseries into one single reality.
 The anime and manga series Eureka Seven: AO takes place in a parallel universe that is different from the one in the series' predecessor Eureka Seven. The E7 series started off in the year 12005, and the AO world, which takes place in the year 2025, would be the home of the two main characters' son.
 The anime and manga series Katekyo Hitman Reborn! by Akira Amano features this idea in its third main arc, known as Future arc.
 The anime Neon Genesis Evangelion features a parallel world in one of the final episodes. This parallel world is a sharp contrast to the harsh, dark "reality" of the show and presents a world where all the characters enjoy a much happier life. This parallel world would become the basis for the new Evangelion manga series Angelic Days.
 The anime series Bakugan features a parallel universe called Vestroia and is the homeworld of fantastic creatures called Bakugan. The series' hero Dan Kuso alongside his friends and teammates must save Earth and Vestroia from total destruction. Season 2 & 3 feature another universe where Dan and his team save the day. They go to another dimension or universe through a pathway. The other universe has also other life forms and other types of technology.
 In another anime series, Digimon, there is a parallel universe called "digital world". The show's child protagonists meet digital monsters, or digimon, from this world and become partners and friends. In the third story arc of Digimon Fusion, the Clockmaker (who is later revealed to be Bagramon) and his partner Clockmon travel through space-time to recruit heroes from previous series so they can help the Fusion Fighters to defeat Quartzmon before DigiQuartz can absorb each human and digital world in the multiverse.
 In the anime series Umineko no Naku Koro ni the rounds of the battle between Battler and Beatrice take place in different dimensions, in order to show all kinds of possibilities (much to Battler's dismay) also the character Bernkastel is known for her ability to travel into different worlds by the usage of "fragments".
 In the Star Trek: The Next Generation episode "Parallels", Lt. Worf traveled to several parallel universes when his shuttlecraft went through a time space fissure.
 The Community episode Remedial Chaos Theory, six different timelines and one "prime" timeline are explored, each having a different outcome based on which member of the study group goes to get the pizza. One timeline, dubbed the "Darkest Timeline", results in the greatest amount of terrible incidents and ends with Abed donning a felt goatee bearing resemblance to Spock's in "Mirror, Mirror".
 In the 2003 anime series of Fullmetal Alchemist, there exists a gateway that can be conjured by alchemists that acts as a source of all knowledge and energy; towards the end of the series, it is revealed that this gateway connects the world of the anime with the real world, set during the first decades of the 20th century. It is revealed that the two worlds shared a common history until their histories diverged, apparently due to the success of alchemy in one world and that of modern physics in the other.

As an ongoing subplot
Sometimes a television series will use parallel universes as an ongoing subplot. Star Trek: Deep Space Nine, Star Trek: Enterprise and Star Trek: Discovery elaborated on the premise of the original series' "Mirror" universe and developed multi-episode story arcs based on the premise. Other examples are the science fiction series Stargate SG-1, the fantasy/horror series Buffy the Vampire Slayer, Supernatural and the romance/fantasy Lois & Clark: The New Adventures of Superman.

Following the precedent set by Star Trek, these story arcs show alternative universes that have turned out "worse" than the "original" universe: in Stargate SG-1 the first two encountered parallel realities featured Earth being overwhelmed by an unstoppable Goa'uld onslaught; in Buffy, two episodes concern a timeline in which Buffy came to Sunnydale too late to stop the vampires from taking control; Lois & Clark repeatedly visits an alternative universe where Clark Kent's adoptive parents, Jonathan and Martha Kent, died when he was ten years of age, and Lois Lane is also apparently dead. Clark eventually becomes Superman, with help from the "original" Lois Lane, but he is immediately revealed as Clark Kent and so has no life of his own.

In addition to following Star Trek's lead, showing the "evil" variants of the main storyline gives the writers an opportunity to show what is at stake by portraying the worst that could happen and the consequences if the protagonists fail or the importance of a character's presence.

Once Upon a Time often talks about alternative realms or universes in which all different forms of magic, and non-magic may occur, depending on the realm. According to the Mad Hatter (Sebastian Stan), they "touch each other in a long line of lands, each just as real as the last". He referred to our world's tendency to deny such things as arrogant.

In the season 1 finale of The Flash, the Reverse-Flash opens a singularity that connects his world to a parallel universe called Earth-2. In the second season, The Flash starts facing villains from that earth who also have doppelgangers on Earth-1 sent by Zoom. The array of Earth-2 villains consists of Atom Smasher, Sand Demon, King Shark, and Dr. Light; all are sent by Zoom to kill The Flash with the assurance of being taken back home. However, they are not the only ones who arrive from the singularity; this also includes the Earth-2 Flash after a close death and loss of speed from a confrontation with Zoom. When the Earth-2 Flash (called Jay Garrick) introduces himself to Team Flash, Barry (The Flash) distrusts him at first and places him in the metahuman pipeline at S.T.A.R. Labs. When The Flash starts having a hard time facing off against Sand Demon, he frees Jay so that he could help him as well as train him in his speed. With a new trick taught by Jay, Barry defeats Sand Demon. Later on, the Earth-2 counterpart of Harrison Wells, arrives on Earth-1 as well. He steals a weapon from Mercury Labs and saves Barry from the Earth-2 King Shark. When Jay confronts and sees Wells again, the argument gets heated between them before Barry intercedes. Up until season 7, a new version of Wells was featured every season.

The "Alf Stewart Rape Dungeon" series, created by artist Mr Doodleburger, uses footage from the Australian TV drama show Home and Away, but through the use of clever overlaid audio tracks, casts one of the main characters of the show, long running character Alf Stewart as a vicious violent character in a parallel version of Home and Away. see main article Alf Stewart Rape Dungeon Series

Television series involving parallel universes
There have been a few series where parallel universes were central to the series itself.
 The Fantastic Journey, in which several travellers lost in the Bermuda Triangle find themselves in another world
 Otherworld, in which a family gets trapped in an alternative world
 Sliders, where a young man invents a worm-hole generator that allows travel to "alternative" Earths. Several characters travel across a series of "alternative" Earths, trying to get back to their home universe
 Parallax, in which a boy discovers portals to multiple parallel universes in his home town
 The Midnight Gospel, in which Clancy Gilroy, a spacecaster travelling through planets to interview guests for his spacecast within his simulator.
 Charlie Jade, in which the titular character is accidentally thrown into our universe and is looking for a way back to his own. The series features three universes - alpha, beta and gamma
 Awake, where a man switches between realities whenever he goes to sleep: one in which his wife survived a car accident that killed their son, and one in which his son survived but his wife died
 In the TV series Fringe, a main element of the series is the loss of balance and the eventual collision of two universes and the moral ramifications of it. Most main characters have a doppelganger who is usually slightly different from their prime selves.
 In the South Korean Drama Dr. Jin (2012), the concept of parallel universes was used. A doctor travels into the past, specifically, the Joseon era, and this results in major changes in history.
 Rick and Morty, in which there is an infinite number of realities and universes.
 Stranger Things, in which a small town becomes home to a gateway between dimensions.
 The Flash, in which Barry Allen travels to multiple parallel universes in the multiverse with the help of his super speed.
 Supernatural, in which several episodes deal with parallel universes, particularly the thirteenth season which features storylines centering around parallel universes known as Apocalypse World and The Bad Place which appears in the backdoor pilot to the proposed spinoff Supernatural: Wayward Sisters. Apocalypse World is depicted as a dark post-apocalyptic universe where Supernatural's main protagonists Sam and Dean Winchester were never born and thus could not stop the end of the world.
 Doctor Who, in which a crack between two parallel universes opens up during the Rose Tyler plot. In which her Father still lives, however, the Cybermen control the parallel earth and pass through to ours.
 The Man in the High Castle, where in a parallel universe Nazis have won World War II, based on the novel by Philip K. Dick.
 The King: Eternal Monarch, in which the country of Korea is unified as a single kingdom in a parallel reality to the Koreas being separated. The two lead characters travel between their respective realities, one from the Republic of South Korea, the other being the aforementioned king.
 Dark, where (previous) existence of an original world was revealed only in the last (third) season. Original world there was destroyed/split into two parallel ones by a genius scientist in pain, because his son's family was lost in an accident and he desperately wanted them back alive. Each of two worlds has their own protagonists group (Sic Mundus Creatus Est vs Erit Lux) fighting for a supremacy of time travel, available in three flavours: via a local cave, swirling blob of God particles and portable drones.
 The OA, in which characters discover parallel universes and attempt to travel to them.
 Amphibia, the main character Anne Boonchuy along with her friends Sasha Waybright and Marcy Wu are transported to the kingdom of Amphibia. The Owl House, where the main character Luz Noceda follows a magic door to the Boiling Isles, is confirmed to share the same universe and multiverse as Amphibia in the Season 2 finale, "King's Tide".
 What If...?, based on the Marvel Comics series of the same name, which explores how the Marvel Cinematic Universe might have unfolded if key moments in its history had occurred differently.
Koala Man takes place in an alternate universe where the wreck of the Titanic never happened, indirectly resulting in the United States of America being destroyed (except Hollywood becoming an island), Australia becoming the world's superpower, and Nicole Kidman becoming its Queen.

Books 

Time Echoes Trilogy by Bryan Davis addresses the idea of parallel worlds as it delves into a plot in which the main character travels between three different "earths" each moving at a different speed of time so one earth is 20 years in the past while another one is 10 minutes into the future when compared to the earth from which the character exists.

Overstrike by C. M. Angus features high-functioning schizophrenics with the ability to simultaneously perceive multiple realities.

Comic books

Parallel universes in modern comics have become particularly rich and complex, in large part due to the continual problem of continuity faced by the major two publishers, Marvel Comics and DC Comics. The two publishers have used the multiverse concept to fix problems arising from integrating characters from other publishers into their own canon, and from having major serial protagonists with continuous histories lasting, as in the case of Superman, over 70 years. Additionally, both publishers have used new alternative universes to re-imagine their own characters. (See Multiverse (DC Comics) and Multiverse (Marvel Comics)) DC's Michael Moorcock's Multiverse collected 12 issues in 1999 with an introduction by Moorcock which offered a sophisticated description of his rationale.

DC Comics inaugurated its multiverse in the early 1960s, with the reintroduction of Golden Age superheroes the Justice Society of America now located on Earth-Two, and devised a "mirror universe" scenario of inverted morality and supervillain domination of Earth-Three shortly afterwards, several years before Star Trek devised its own darker alternative universe. There was a lull before DC inaugurated additional alternative universes in the seventies, such as Earth-X, where there was an Axis victory in World War II, Earth-S, home to the Fawcett Comics superheroes of the forties and fifties, such as Captain Marvel, and Earth-Prime, where superheroes only existed in fictional forms.

Therefore, comic books, in general, are one of the few entertainment mediums where the concept of parallel universes are a major and ongoing theme. DC in particular periodically revisits the idea in major crossover storylines, such as Crisis on Infinite Earths and Infinite Crisis, where Marvel has a series called What If... that's devoted to exploring alternative realities, which sometimes impact the "main" universe's continuity. DC's version of "What If..." is the Elseworlds imprint.

DC Comics series 52 heralded the return of the Multiverse. 52 was a mega-crossover event tied to Infinite Crisis which was the sequel to the 1980s Crisis on Infinite Earths. The aim was to yet again address many of the problems and confusions brought on by the Multiverse in the DCU. Now 52 Earths exist and including some Elseworld tales such as Kingdom Come, DC's imprint WildStorm and an Earth devoted to the Charlton Comics heroes of DC. Countdown and Countdown Presents: The Search for Ray Palmer and the Tales of the Multiverse stories expand upon this new multiverse.

Marvel has also had many large crossover events which depicted an alternative universe, many springing from events in the X-Men books, such as 1981's Days of Future Past, 1995's Age of Apocalypse, and 2006's House of M  and 2014's Spider-Verse storyline involving alternate versions of Spider-Man. In addition, the Squadron Supreme is a DC inspired Marvel Universe that has been used several times, often crossing over into the mainstream Universe in the Avengers comic. Exiles is an offshoot of the X-Men franchise that allows characters to hop from one alternative reality to another, leaving the original, main Marvel Universe intact. The Marvel UK line has long had multiverse stories including the Jaspers' Warp storyline of Captain Britain's first series (it was here that the designation Earth-616 was first applied to the mainstream Marvel Universe).

Marvel Comics, as of 2000, launched their most popular parallel universe, the Ultimate Universe. It is a smaller subline to the mainstream titles and features Ultimate Spider-Man, Ultimate X-Men, Ultimate Fantastic Four and the Ultimates (their "Avengers").

The graphic novel Watchmen is set in an alternative history, in 1985 where superheroes exist, the Vietnam War was won by the United States, and Richard Nixon is in his fifth term as President of the United States. The Soviet Union and the United States are still locked in an escalating "Cold War" as in our own world, but as the Soviet Union invades Afghanistan in this world and threatens Pakistan, nuclear war may be imminent.

In 1973, Tammy published The Clock and Cluny Jones, where a mysterious grandfather clock hurls bully Cluny Jones into a harsh alternative reality where she becomes the bullied. This story was reprinted in Misty annual 1985 as Grandfather's Clock.

In 1978, Misty published The Sentinels. The Sentinels were two crumbling apartment blocks that connected the mainstream world with an alternative reality where Hitler conquered Britain in 1940.

In 1981, Jinty published Worlds Apart. Six girls experience alternative worlds ruled by greed, sports-mania, vanity, crime, intellectualism, and fear. These are in fact their dream worlds becoming real after they are knocked out by a mysterious gas from a chemical tanker that crashed into their school. In 1977 Jinty also published Land of No Tears where a lame girl travels to a future world where people with things wrong with them are cruelly treated, and emotions are banned.

The parallel universe concept has also appeared prominently in the Sonic the Hedgehog comic series from Archie Comics. The first and most oft-recurring case of this is another "mirror universe" where Sonic and his various allies are evil or anti-heroic while the counterpart of the evil Dr. Robotnik is good. Another recurring universe featured in the series is a perpendicular dimension that runs through all others, known as the No Zone. The inhabitants of this universe monitor travel between the others, often stepping in with their Zone Cop police force to punish those who travel without authorization between worlds.

In more recent years, the comic has adapted the alternative dimension from the video games Sonic Rush and Sonic Rush Adventure, home to Sonic's ally Blaze the Cat. The continuities seen in various other Sonic franchises also exist in the comic, most notably those based on the cartoon series Sonic Underground and Sonic X. For some years, a number of other universes were also featured that parodied various popular franchises, such as Sailor Moon, Godzilla, and various titles from Marvel Comics. Archie has also used this concept as the basis for crossovers between Sonic and other titles that they publish, including Sabrina the Teenage Witch and Mega Man.

The various Transformers comics also feature the parallel universe concept, and feature the various continuities from different branches of the franchise as parallel worlds that occasionally make contact with each other. Quite notably, the annual Botcon fan convention introduced a comic storyline that featured Cliffjumper, an Autobot from the original Transformers series, entering an alternative universe where his fellow Autobots are evil and the Decepticons are good. This universe is known as the "Shattered Glass" universe, and continued on in comics and text based stories after its initial release.

Audio drama

Within the Wires takes place in a parallel universe in which family structures and countries have been abolished after a "Great Reckoning" has killed a large share of the world population.

In The Gray Area, the seven part serial "Paths Not Taken" takes place in an alternative universe in which Donald Trump has won a second presidential term, gay people are criminalized and arrested, and a violent authoritarian movement known as the "Thanksgiving Cleanse" has swept the nation. In addition, the main universe of the series takes place in a timeline in which Hillary Clinton won the 2016 presidential election.

Victoriocity takes place in an alternative 1887 London, where "Queen Victoria is a cyborg and a real-life architect is worshipped by a legion of laborers."

Video games

 In the adventure game 9: The Last Resort (1996), after resolving several mind-blowing and unique puzzles, the player gets past "The Tiki Guards"; and a door opens up to "The Void" - actually a room to another universe, which houses the entirety of space.
 Banjo-Kazooie (1998) features a world called "Click Clock Wood", which has spring, summer, autumn and winter variants. The environment develops between the seasons making some areas accessible or inaccessible, and actions taken in one season affect the outcome in others.
 The first-person shooter BioShock Infinite (2013) features the many worlds interpretation of quantum mechanics. The main character is named Booker Dewitt, an homage to physicist Bryce DeWitt.
 The 2018 fighting game BlazBlue: Cross Tag Battle brings together the universes in a BlazBlue, Persona 4 Arena, Under Night In-Birth, and RWBY in a singularity called the “Phantom Field” where the characters fight over the “Keystones”.
 The story of Chrono Cross (1999) centers around travel between two alternative timelines, the original or "Another World" and "Home World" which is a branch created by the actions of the heroes of the game's predecessor, Chrono Trigger.
City of Heroes (2004), a massively multiplayer online role-playing game, features a Player vs Player (PvP) zone called Recluse's Victory. It is an alternative future in a constant state of flux, as heroes and villains battle for the future of Earth.
 Crash Twinsanity (2004) features Crash, Cortex, and Nina traveling to the "10th dimension", which could also be a parallel universe (suggested by the theme and how everything seems to be opposite, with the presence of an "Evil Crash", and also planned to have "Good Cortex" and "Evil Coco", but they were cut during development).
 In the psychological horror point-and-click adventure game Dark Seed (1992), the main character Mike Dawson discovers a parallel universe by going through his living room mirror.
 The Darkness (2007) pivots around a world of darkness you travel to when you die, which is occupied by World War 1 soldiers.
 EarthBound (1994) features many areas of the game that can be considered alternative dimensions. The first is an illusion created by the Mani Mani Statue that transforms the metropolis of Fourside into a bizarre neon metropolis called Moonside, filled with unusual characters and enemies. The second is Magicant, the world of Ness's subconscious that is accessed after obtaining the Eight Melodies. Finally, toward the end of the game, the protagonists arrive at the Cave to the Past, where they travel back in time to the haunting past dimension of the cave to face Giygas.
 The Elder Scrolls IV: Oblivion (2006) features an alternative hellish world called "Oblivion", as well as a painting you can climb into and a quest where you enter a dream world.
Fallout series (1997– ) takes place in a subtly different universe. For example, the ship that landed the first men on the moon in 1969 is called Valiant 11, rather than Apollo 11. This universe diverged from ours after World War II, which resulted in a lack of advanced computers, the Cold War, VHS, etc.
 In Freedom Force (2002), most of the story is set in Patriot City, but a number of other locations and time periods are used, including magical realms, prehistoric times, and realms entirely removed from time and space.
Half-Life series (1998– ) revolves heavily around alternative universes. Xen is a location in the first Half-Life game, accidentally discovered by scientists and described as a border world between dimensions, where the player must travel to stop an alien invasion. Half-Life 2 features a multidimensional empire called The Combine which has successfully conquered Earth and subdued humanity, among countless other universes and species.
Heroes of the Storm (2015) takes place in the Nexus, a strange limbo of clashing universes, which collide from across space, time, and dimensions. The Nexus exists in the center of a trans-dimensional cosmic storm, which can rip worlds and universes in and out of existence, and it can also pull worlds into stability. Some of the central realms in the Nexus are examples of these points of stability. Every Realm within the Nexus has one stone called "Singularity", and only the one who achieves it through conquest can become the Realm Lord. Many powerful warriors have been sucked into the Nexus, including combatants from Warcraft, StarCraft, Diablo, and Overwatch universes. New combatants are constantly arriving, some of them are chosen after they died in their original reality.
Kingdom Hearts series (2002– ) features a Disney/Square Enix's Final Fantasy multiverse, in which various worlds are based on Disney films or concepts from the Final Fantasy line. The series also introduces the concept of different "Realms" corresponding to Light, Darkness, and In-Between where all of the worlds take place.
In the Kirby series, some of the most prominent locations are other dimensions in the form of Another Dimension, The Mirror World, Cyberspace, Dreamscape, and much more. The Kirby Clash series of games take place in the Dream Kingdom, in a parallel universe apart from the series' primary setting of Dream Land. These games are connected to the main series' canon through the events of Kirby's Return to Dream Land Deluxe.
The series Legacy of Kain (1996– ) is played through several realms and timelines.
 The Legend of Zelda: A Link to the Past (1991) features a dark and twisted parallel version of Hyrule called the "Dark World". In the Ocarina of Time (1998) after the main protagonist, Link, defeats the dark lord, Ganon, he travels back in time to his childhood. This results in two alternative histories for Hyrule. In one a younger version Link travels to the land of Termina in Majora's Mask (2000). In the other Link is no longer present allowing Ganon to return to go on a rampage that forced the gods of Hyrule to flood the world in The Wind Waker (2002). There is also a scenario in which Link is killed by Ganon in the final battle, resulting in an alternative history in which Hyrule is put in an era of decline, leading to the events of A Link to the Past. The Majora's Mask takes place in Termina, a parallel world to Hyrule. Almost all of the characters from Ocarina of Time reappear in the game. The Oracle of Seasons and Oracle of Ages (2001) use a similar concept to that which is used in A Link to the Past. In those games, the player must switch between the parallel past and present worlds (Ages) and between spring, summer, autumn and winter (Seasons) to progress through the game. In the first half of Twilight Princess (2006), areas of Hyrule are veiled by the Twilight Realm. These areas are dusky and brooding in appearance, Link cannot transform out of wolf form, characters only appear as spirits that cannot be communicated with, and enemies are twilight variations of their regular forms. Otherwise, the Twilight Realm is identical to regular Hyrule.
 The world of the classic cult adventure games of The Longest Journey (1999) created by Ragnar Thornqast, along with its sequels, deals with the existence of two parallel universes – technological (Stark) and magical (Arcadia).
 Metroid Prime 2: Echoes (2004) involves a world, "Aether", having an alternative self in the, "Dark" realm, universe, or dimension. The protagonist, Samus, finds out that she just dropped into a hopeless war for the Luminoth, the dominant species of Light Aether against the Ing, the dominant species of Dark Aether. She also finds her counterpart, Dark Samus or Metroid Prime's essence inside Samus's Phazon Suit.
 In the adventure PC game Myst (1993), the unnamed protagonist travels to multiple alternative worlds through the use of special books, which describe a world within and transport the user to that world when a window on the front page is touched.
 In OtherSpace (1998), a text-based science fiction MMORPG, refugees from Earth's universe were forced to migrate to a parallel universe called "Hiverspace", whose quantum divergence occurred billions of years in the past, after damage to the time/space continuum began to tear their own universe apart. Eventually, they were able to find a means back to a past universe whose quantum divergence from their original ones was relatively minor.
 In the role-playing game Outcast (1999), a probe is sent to a parallel universe and is attacked by an "entity". Cutter Slade must escort a team of scientists across to the other world in order to retrieve and repair the damaged probe before the earth is consumed by a black hole.
 Persona 2: Eternal Punishment (2000) takes place in an alternative universe called "This Side" where in the events of Innocent Sin did not take place and the characters have never met in the past.
 Persona 4 (2008) features the main cast entering an alternate dimension called the TV World, which exists as part of the Collective Unconscious in the larger Megami Tensei multiverse, to find a serial killer in the town of Inaba.
Portal 2 (2011), an action-adventure video game, features a game-mode entitled "Perpetual Testing Initiative" (PeTI), where a plot item features protagonist "Bendy" through thousands of different worlds of which character Cave Johnson exist in different roles entitled "The Multiverse", and the PeTI's parallel universes are different from the main Half-Life/Portal timeline.
 Resistance: Fall of Man (2006) is set in alternative universe where Tsarist Russia never experienced the Russian Revolution but instead became the bridgehead for an aggressive alien invasion from a species known as the "Chimera", who then proceed to overrun Western Europe, Great Britain, Canada and much of the United States, and where there has been no Second World War as a result. The events of the game and its sequels begin in its alternative 1951.
 In the survival horror video game series Silent Hill (1999– ), the town of Silent Hill fluctuates between the real world, where Silent Hill is seemingly just an ordinary tourist town, the Fog World, which is like the real world, except the town is shrouded in thick fog and is nearly uninhabited except for monsters and a few people, and a dark and dilapidated version of the town called the "Other World".
 Each Zone in Sonic CD (1993) has four variations: Past, Present, Bad Future and Good Future, each displaying some subtle and not-so subtle alterations. The series has also seen alternative dimensions, and parallel universes in the case of the Sonic Rush (2005), in which Sonic encounters a hero from another world named Blaze the Cat whose nemesis is an alternative counterpart of his own foe, Dr. Eggman. The Sonic series of Sonic The Hedgehog 2006, Generations And Rivals also makes use of the concept of Wormholes, and alternative timelines.
 Sudeki (2004) is set in a realm of light and a parallel realm of darkness.
 Super Mario 64 (1996) features a world called "Tiny Huge Island" which has two variants: one scaled up, the other scaled down. The player can only access certain parts of the level to obtain certain stars depending on which variant they are into. The two variants can be switched between via portals in the world.
 Super Mario Bros. 2 (1988) features a "Magic Potion" item that when used, creates a doorway allowing the player to temporarily access "Subspace"; a mirrored silhouette version of the world where items can be found.
 After the completion of the Special World in Super Mario World (1990), the overworld transforms from a green-colored springtime to an orange-colored autumnal setting. Many enemies encountered in the game are transformed into bizarre counterparts.
 In Super Paper Mario (2007), the town "Flipside" (which acts as the game's central hub) has an alternative mirrored version called "Flopside". While Flipside appears pristine and the residents there are typically cheerful, Flopside appears somewhat dilapidated and is populated by surly characters.
 Both titles of the When They Cry visual novel series (Higurashi and Umineko for short) contain the concept of parallel worlds. These series both involve some kind of murder mystery. As soon as the main character has 'lost', another parallel world, called a Fragment, is chosen to be observed. This continues until the entire mystery is solved.
 The visual novel/puzzle video game series Zero Escape heavily uses the concept of multiple realities as the basis for its plot as well as its central gameplay mechanic of traversing through realities and altering history. In this fictional universe, characters use a method of travelling between different timelines called "SHIFT" (short for "Spacetime Human Internal Fluctuating Travel"). 
 The survival video game Don't Starve (2013) involves the many playable characters efforts to survive in a semi-nightmarish parallel world of wilderness known as the Constant, the story reveals that much of the world was once ruled by a race of sentient and technologically advanced arthropodal creatures, who destroyed themselves with the overuse of nightmare fuel, the Constant appears to change according to how afraid the characters are feeling, and is now controlled by mysterious shadow creatures that appear to those who are afraid and is also somewhat controlled by whoever is trapped on the "nightmare throne".
 Agents of Mayhem is set in an alternative universe to the Saints Row series in which the Third Street Saints never forms, which leads up to Vice Kings, Los Carnales and Westside Rollerz uniting into one gang.
 In Left 4 Dead 2 The Last Stand Update (2020), release The Last Stand map where all players case that the survivors took a different path leading to the Death Toll Finale. Instead of going to the Boathouse, players choose to go to the Lighthouse by a truck. Players must light the long-disused lighthouse and fight against a lot of infected to wait a rescue boat.

Fan fiction

See also
 Interdimensional being
 List of fiction employing parallel universes
 World as Myth

References

External links

Parallel Universe: is there any other life?

Bibliography
 
 

 
Fiction
Science fiction themes
Setting